Arron Reed (born 10 July 1999) is an English professional rugby union player who plays as a wing for Sale Sharks in Premiership Rugby.

Career
Reed was educated at Kirkham Grammar School and joined the Sale Sharks academy at the age of fifteen. In November 2017 he made his club debut for Sale against Worcester Warriors in the Anglo-Welsh Cup.

In April 2017 Reed scored two tries for England under-18 against Ireland. He scored a try for England under-20 against Scotland in the final round of the 2019 Six Nations Under 20s Championship. Later that year he was a member of the squad at the 2019 World Rugby Under 20 Championship however an injury sustained in a pool match against Italy ruled him out for the rest of the tournament.

References

External links
Sale Sharks Profile
ESPN Profile
Ultimate Rugby Profile

1999 births
Living people
English rugby union players
Sale Sharks players
Rugby union players from Chester
Rugby union wings
People educated at Kirkham Grammar School